Hamlet is a 2009 television film adaptation of the Royal Shakespeare Company's 2008 modern-dress stage production of William Shakespeare's play of the same name, aired on BBC Two on 26 December 2009.  It was broadcast by PBS' Great Performances in the United States on 28 April 2010.

Directed by Gregory Doran, it features the original stage cast of David Tennant in the title role of Prince Hamlet, Patrick Stewart as both King Claudius and the ghost of Hamlet's father, Penny Downie as Queen Gertrude, Mariah Gale as Ophelia, Edward Bennett as Laertes, Oliver Ford Davies as Polonius, and Peter de Jersey as Horatio.

Production
The production was filmed with a single-camera setup, using the pioneering RED One camera technology.

Cast
 Prince Hamlet — David Tennant
 King Claudius / King Hamlet — Patrick Stewart
 Queen Gertrude — Penny Downie
 Ophelia — Mariah Gale
 Horatio — Peter de Jersey
 Laertes — Edward Bennett
 Polonius — Oliver Ford Davies
 Rosencrantz / Second Gravedigger — Sam Alexander
 Guildenstern — Tom Davey
 Gravedigger — Mark Hadfield
 Player King — John Woodvine
 Osric / Player Queen — Ryan Gage
Dumbshow King — Samuel Dutton
Dumbshow Queen / Priest — Jim Hooper
 Reynaldo / Dumbshow Poisoner — David Ajala
 Marcellus — Keith Osborn
 Barnardo — Ewen Cummins
 Francisco / Fortinbras — Robert Curtis
 Voltemand — Roderick Smith
 Cornelia — Andrea Harris
 Lucianus — Ricky Champ
Lady-in-waiting — Riann Steele
Lady-in-waiting — Zoe Thorne

DVD release
The film was released by 2 Entertain in the United Kingdom and Ireland on DVD on 4 January 2010 and on Blu-ray on 19 April 2010 and on DVD and Blu-ray on 4 May 2010 in the United States and Canada.

References

Bibliography

Further reading

External links
 
  
 Archived Site - BBC

BBC television dramas
2009 television films
2009 films
Films based on Hamlet
Modern adaptations of works by William Shakespeare